Punks is a 2000 film produced by Babyface, directed by Patrik-Ian Polk, and starring Rockmond Dunbar, Seth Gilliam, Renoly Santiago, Jazzmun, and Dwight Ewell.

The film follows the trials and tribulations of a group of gay African American friends. While black gay life is explored in the film, universal aspects of friendship plays at the plot's forefront. The film's themes were later used for the 2005 Logo cable television series Noah's Arc.

The film was popular at film festivals but never had distribution due to rights issues with the Sister Sledge songs featured prominently in the story. It was shown on Logo on August 7, 2011. Otherwise it remains unavailable through home media but has occasional private screenings.

Cast 
Seth Gilliam as Marcus
Dwight Ewell as Hill
Renoly Santiago as Dante
Rockmond Dunbar as Darby
Jazzmun as Chris/Crystal
Rudolf Martin as Gilbert
Vanessa Estelle Williams as Jennifer
Devon Odessa as Felicity
Loretta Devine as Health Counselor
Rodney Chester as Alexis Carrington Colby Dexter
Thea Vidale as Nurse

Awards and nominations
Black Reel Awards
Best Independent Actor - Theatrical:
(Rockmond Dunbar) Winner
Cleveland International Film Festival
Best American Independent Feature Film: Winner
GLAAD Media Awards
Outstanding Film - Limited Release: Nominated
Independent Spirit Awards
John Cassavetes Award:
(Patrik-Ian Polk, Tracey Edmonds and Michael McQuarn) Nominated
L.A. Outfest
Outstanding Emerging Talent:
(Patrik-Ian Polk) Winner

References

External links

2000 films
2000 comedy films
2000 LGBT-related films
African-American comedy films
African-American LGBT-related films
American LGBT-related films
Brookwell McNamara Entertainment films
Films directed by Patrik-Ian Polk
Transgender-related films
2000 directorial debut films
2000s English-language films
2000s American films